William Ernest Tottey (6 October 1888 – 2 September 1943) was an Australian rules footballer who played with Melbourne, Richmond and St Kilda in the Victorian Football League (VFL).

Family
The son of Joseph Tottey, and Janet Sarah Tottey, née Winter, William Ernest Tottey was born in South Melbourne on 6 October 1888. He married Ethel May Meighan in 1917.

Death
He died on 2 September 1943 at the Melbourne Hospital.

Notes

External links 

 
 Bill Tottey, at Demonwiki.

1888 births
1943 deaths
Australian rules footballers from Victoria (Australia)
Melbourne Football Club players
Richmond Football Club players
St Kilda Football Club players